Tierney Pfirman is an American professional basketball player for ACS Sepsi SIC of Liga Națională the top flight of women's basketball in Romania. She played college basketball for Maryland.

Early years
Pfirman attended South Williamsport Area Junior/Senior High School located in South Williamsport, Pennsylvania.

High school awards
 2× AP All-State First team (as junior & senior)
 AP All-State Second team (as sophomore)
 AP All-State Third team (as freshman)
 4× Associated Press All-State honoree
 4× First Team All-Conference in Heartland III 
 2× Williamsport Sun-Gazette Female Athlete of the Year (as junior & senior)
 2× Williamsport Sun-Gazette Player of the Year (as junior and senior)
 3× ESPN Radio Williamsport 104.1FM/1050AM Basketball Player of the Year (as sophomore, junior & senior)

College career

Freshman year 2012–13
Saw action in 21 games and started in 12, recorded 9 points in first ever game at Maryland in an 88–47 win over Mount Saint Mary's.  Scored in double digits for the first time next game vs Loyola Maryland the Terps won 88–45. Was named ACC Rookie of the week on December 10, after 11, 17 and 19 points in three games that week all wins. She dislocated her knee cap after colliding with a practice player and missed 4–6 weeks which ruled her out for remainder of the season.

Sophomore year 2013–14

Junior year 2014–15

Senior year 2015–16

Maryland statistics

Source

Professional career
On July 19, 2016 Pfirman signed with Sepsi-SIC of the Romanian women's basketball league the top flight of women's basketball in Romania.

References

External links
 Maryland bio

1994 births
Living people
American expatriate basketball people in Romania
American women's basketball players
Basketball players from Pennsylvania
Maryland Terrapins women's basketball players
Sportspeople from Williamsport, Pennsylvania
Forwards (basketball)